Adelheid "Heidi" Schmid (after marriage Grundmann-Schmid, born 5 December 1938) is a retired German fencer who competed at the 1960, 1964 and 1968 Olympics in the individual and team foil events. She won an individual gold in 1960 and a team bronze medal in 1964.

Career 
Schmid took fencing when she was 13 years old.  One year later, 14 years old, she finished third in the German youth championships.  She became female German champion in foil fencing in 1957, 1959, 1964, 1965, 1966, 1967 and 1968.

On 1 September 1960 Heidi Schmid won the Olympic gold medal in Palazzo dei Congressi in Rome, after defeating Maria Vicol from Romania with a 4:3 score. Four years later, she was part of the German team (Gudrun Theuerkauff, Heidi Schmid, Rosemarie Scherberger and Helga Mees) that received a bronze medal in the team competition. The team qualified from pool C, defeated France in the quarterfinal, lost to the Hungarian team in the semifinal, and defeated Italy in the bronze final.

In 1961 Schmid became the world champion and also student world champion in foil, and was selected German sportswoman of the year. In addition, she won an individual silver medal at the 1957 world championships, and two team silver medals.

Later life
After retiring from competitions Schmid worked as a music teacher. She married a fellow teacher Hans Grundmann.

Awards
German sportswoman of the year 1961.
Honorary member of her home club TSV Schwaben Augsburg from 1995.

References

External links

1938 births
Living people
Sportspeople from Klagenfurt
German female fencers
Olympic fencers of the United Team of Germany
Olympic fencers of West Germany
Fencers at the 1960 Summer Olympics
Fencers at the 1964 Summer Olympics
Fencers at the 1968 Summer Olympics
Olympic gold medalists for the United Team of Germany
Olympic bronze medalists for the United Team of Germany
Olympic medalists in fencing
Medalists at the 1960 Summer Olympics
Medalists at the 1964 Summer Olympics
Universiade medalists in fencing
Universiade gold medalists for West Germany
Medalists at the 1961 Summer Universiade